The 2017 FC Edmonton season was the club's seventh season of existence. The club would play in North American Soccer League, the second tier of the American soccer pyramid. It would also be the clubs last in the NASL before taking an 8-month hiatus before joining the CPL ahead of its inaugural season in 2019.

Roster

Transfers

Winter

In:

Out:

Summer

In:

Out:

Competitions

NASL Spring season

Standings

Results summary

Results by round

Matches

NASL Fall season

Standings

Results summary

Results by round

Matches

Canadian Championship

Squad Statistics

Appearances and goals

|-
|colspan="14"|Players away on loan:
|-
|colspan="14"|Players who left FC Edmonton during the season:

|-
|}

Goal scorers

Disciplinary Record

References

External links

FC Edmonton seasons
Edmonton
Edmonton